Bosc-Roger-sur-Buchy is a former commune in the Seine-Maritime department in the Normandy region in northern France. On 1 January 2017, it was merged into the commune Buchy.

The inhabitants of the town of Bosc-Roger-sur-Buchy are called Rogélois, Rogéloises in French.

Geography

Population

Places of interest
 The church of Notre-Dame, dating from the sixteenth century.

See also
Communes of the Seine-Maritime department

References

Former communes of Seine-Maritime